Mhamed Arezki (born 1984) is a French actor of Algeria origins best known for his starring and supporting roles in French television series. He portrays Lyès Beloumi on the action packed, comedic, police drama Les Bleus, young Tony on the gangster mini-series Les Beaux Mecs and Brigadier Jean-Baptiste Medjaoui on another police drama, Candice Renoir. He is also known for his roles in such films as The Tourist (starring Angelina Jolie and Johnny Depp), Zim and Co. and Adieu Gary.

Biography

Mhamed Arezki was born in Paris, France, in 1984. His mother was of Kabyle descent and worked as a nanny. His father was a chef. Mhamed always dreamed of being an actor. At the age of seventeen he quit school and started participating in various acting courses. His mother, knowing this was what her son wanted to do most, was very encouraging. At the end of a five-day course in film and theater acting, he was spotted by an agent who then brought him to a casting call. "I know, I have a lot of luck," He told Le Parisien in 2009.

Career

Les Bleus

From 2006 to 2010 Arezki had a starring role in Les bleus: premiers pas dans la police, an action, comedy, drama about rookie cops learning the ropes. The first episode aired in France on 8 February 2006.

Arezki played the role of clumsy, good-natured, career driven Lyès Beloumi. He was in every episode of Seasons 1 and 2. For the third season he took a voluntary sabbatical to leave himself open for other roles and to explore the possibility of doing a one-man show. In 2010 he returned to Les Bleus for the fourth and final season. Lyes Beloumi had been away training and returned with the rank of Commissaire and now had his own office.

In 2013 Arezki reunited with Les Bleus co-star Raphaël Lenglet for the first season of Candice Renoir, a France 2 police drama series starring Cécile Bois as Commandant Candice Renoir. Lenglet and Arezki receive second and third billing respectively on French sites like Allociné.

Filmography

Awards
Festival du film de télévision de Luchon 2006 :
 Best young actor for his role in Les Bleuspresented by Tchéky Karyo

See also
 Les Bleus (TV series)

References

External links
 Mhamed Arezki on Allociné
 
 Mhamed Arezki's Agent

Male actors from Paris
21st-century French male actors
French male television actors
French male film actors
French comedians
1984 births
Kabyle people
French people of Kabyle descent
Living people